The DHB-Pokal (English: German Handball Federation Cup) is an elimination handball tournament held annually in Germany. It is the second most important handball national title in the country after the Handball-Bundesliga championship.

DHB-Pokal Winners

 
Handball in Germany
Professional sports leagues in Germany